Marie Gaspard (born 1978) is a French slalom canoeist who competed at the international level from 1995 to 2006.

Career
Gaspard won a gold medal in the K1 team event at the 2006 ICF Canoe Slalom World Championships in Prague. She also won a bronze medal in the same event at the 2006 European Championships in L'Argentière-la-Bessée.

References

French female canoeists
Living people
1978 births
Medalists at the ICF Canoe Slalom World Championships